Anni Kronbichler (born 22 March 1963) is an Austrian former alpine skier who competed in the 1984 Winter Olympics.

Career
During her career she has achieved 27 results among the top 10 (7 podiums) in the World Cup.

World Cup results
Top 3

References

External links
 
 

1963 births
Living people
Austrian female alpine skiers
Olympic alpine skiers of Austria
People from Kufstein
Alpine skiers at the 1984 Winter Olympics
Sportspeople from Tyrol (state)
20th-century Austrian women